HMT Warwick Deeping (H136) was a naval trawler of the British Royal Naval Patrol Service during World War II, sunk off the Isle of Wight in October 1940.

Ship history
The Warwick Deeping was built in 1934 by Cochrane & Sons Shipbuilders of Selby for the Newington Steam Trawling Company of Kingston upon Hull as a North Sea fishing trawler.

She was acquired by the Admiralty in August 1939 and converted into an anti-submarine patrol vessel, armed with a single  gun, machine guns, depth charges, and fitted with ASDIC, and assigned to the 17th Anti-Submarine Group at Portsmouth.

The two British ships soon found themselves under fire, and Listrac, believing that the German ships were Royal Navy vessels attacking in error switched on her identification lights. She was promptly shelled, causing a large explosion aboard, and then torpedoed and sunk, with the loss of her captain and 11 men. The Warwick Deeping attempted to escape, but was relentlessly attacked, and hit by a torpedo, which failed to explode. She was hit several times by shells, one of which finally disabled her engines. Now helpless and sinking, the crew abandoned the ship, but instead of delivering the coup de grace the German torpedo boats unexpectedly broke off their attack and sailed away. An hour later all 22 crew were rescued.

See also
 Trawlers of the Royal Navy

References

External links
  
 
 
 

1934 ships
Anti-submarine trawlers of the Royal Navy
Maritime incidents in October 1940
Ships built in Selby